Harold James Bennett (9 June 1891 – 9 July 1964) was an Australian rules footballer.

He started his VFL/AFL career with University playing most of the 1911 season. It was his only year as per usual, studies took over from the clubs players. 

He played football for Rochester Football Club before once again playing back in the big-time, playing season 1914 for South Melbourne.

Bennett played in Rochester's 1914 Goulburn Valley Football League premiership win over Shepparton.

Footnotes

References
 League Football: The South Melbourne Team, The Weekly Times, (Saturday, 13 June 1908), p.25.

External links

1891 births
1964 deaths
Sydney Swans players
University Football Club players
Rochester Football Club players
Australian rules footballers from Victoria (Australia)
Australian military personnel of World War I